Heppnerographa circinnata is a species of moth of the family Tortricidae which is endemic to Venezuela.

The ground colour of the forewings is white cream with pale ochreous suffusions. The markings are ochreous, but browner at the dorsum. The hindwings are whitish cream, tinged pale ochreous in the distal area.

Etymology
The specific name refers to the shape of the end of the socius and is derived from circinnatus (meaning rounded).

References

External links

Moths described in 2006
Endemic fauna of Venezuela
Tortricidae of South America
circinnata
Taxa named by Józef Razowski